In analytical chemistry, dark current refers to the constant response produced by a spectrochemical receptor, even in the absence of radiation. This response adds to the signal produced when the receptor is used to measure light and so must be dealt with to determine how much of the detector response is actually due to the radiation. To compensate for this extra signal, the dark current may be measured in the absence of radiation and then subtracted from the final signal or reduced to zero by a compensating circuit. This is often referred to as "blanking" and is a form of blank correction.

Analytical chemistry